is a passenger railway station in located in the city of Shijōnawate, Osaka Prefecture, Japan, operated by West Japan Railway Company (JR West).

Lines
Shinobugaoka Station is served by the Katamachi Line (Gakkentoshi Line), and is located from the starting point of the line at Kizu Station.

Station layout
The station has two elevated side platforms with the station building underneath. The station is staffed.

Platforms

Adjacent stations

History
The station was opened on 1 May 1953. 

Station numbering was introduced in March 2018 with Shinobugaoka being assigned station number JR-H33.

Passenger statistics
In fiscal 2019, the station was used by an average of 8,783 passengers daily (boarding passengers only).

Surrounding area
 Shinobugaoka Shrine
 Shinobugaoka Kofun

References

External links

Official home page 

Railway stations in Japan opened in 1953
Railway stations in Osaka Prefecture
 Shijōnawate